Electronic art is a form of art that makes use of electronic media. More broadly, it refers to technology and/or electronic media. It is related to information art, new media art, video art, digital art, interactive art, internet art, and electronic music. It is considered an outgrowth of conceptual art and systems art.

Background

The term electronic art is almost synonymous to computer art and digital art. The latter two terms, and especially the term computer-generated art are mostly used for visual artworks generated by computers. However, electronic art has a much broader connotation, referring to artworks that include any type of electronic component, such as works in music, dance, architecture and performance. It is an interdisciplinary field and so artists often collaborate with scientists and engineers when creating their works. The art historian of electronic art Edward A. Shanken works to document current and past experimental art with a focus on the intersection of art, science, and technology. Other writers on the topic of electronic art include Frank Popper, Dominique Moulon, Sarah Cook, and Christiane Paul.

Electronic art often features components of interactivity.  Artists make use of technologies like the Internet, computer networks, robotics, wearable technology, digital painting, wireless technology and immersive virtual reality. As the technologies used to deliver works of electronic art become obsolete, electronic art faces serious issues around the challenge to preserve artwork beyond the time of its contemporary production. Currently, research projects are underway to improve the preservation and documentation of the fragile electronic arts heritage (see DOCAM - Documentation and Conservation of the Media Arts Heritage).

Art festivals that use the term "electronic art" in their name
 International Symposium for Electronic Art (ISEA), organized annually since 1988, international
 Ars Electronica Symposium, organized yearly since 1979 by Ars Electronica in Linz, Austria
 Dutch Electronic Art Festival (DEAF), organized yearly since 1994 by V2 Institute for the Unstable Media in Rotterdam, the Netherlands
 Electronic Language International Festival (FILE) organized yearly since 2000 in São Paulo, Brazil
The Prix Ars Electronica, a major yearly award for several categories of electronic art

Artists

Notable artists working in electronic art include:

 Laurie Anderson
 Roy Ascott
 Maurice Benayoun
 Maurizio Bolognini
 Angie Bonino
 Mez Breeze
 Miguel Chevalier
 Heiko Daxl
 Elizabeth Diller
 David Em
 Ken Feingold
 Ingeborg Fülepp
 Peter Gabriel
 Walter Giers
 Pietro Grossi
 Genco Gulan
 Garnet Hertz
 Perry Hoberman
 Jodi (art collective)
 Eduardo Kac
 Knowbotic Research
 Marc Lee
 George Legrady
 Golan Levin
 Liu Dao
 Rafael Lozano-Hemmer
 Chico MacMurtrie
 Sergio Maltagliati
 Jennifer & Kevin McCoy
 Yucef Merhi
 Joseph Nechvatal
 Yves Netzhammer
 Graham Nicholls
 Simon Penny
 Melinda Rackham
 Martin Rev
 Ken Rinaldo
 David Rokeby
 Stefan Roloff
 Lillian Schwartz
 Ricardo Scofidio
 Paul Sermon
 Scott Snibbe
 Michael Snow
 Stelarc
 Survival Research Laboratories
 Gianni Toti
 Tamás Waliczky
 Norman White

See also

Algorithm art
Artificial intelligence art
Artmedia
Computer art
Computer art scene
Computer graphics
Computer music
Cybernetic art
Demoscene
Digital art
Digital illustration
Digital painting
Digital poetry
EVA Conferences (Electronic Visualisation and the Arts)
Evolutionary art
Fractal art
Generative art
Image development
Interactive art
Intermedia
Multimedia
Music visualization
New media art
Systems art

Notes

References
 Sarah J. Rogers (ed), Body Mécanique: Artistic Explorations of Digital Realms, Columbus, Ohio, Wexner Center for the Arts, The Ohio State University, 1998
 Christine Buci-Glucksmann, "L’art à l’époque du virtuel", in Frontières esthétiques de l’art, Arts 8, Paris: L’Harmattan, 2004
 Frank Popper, Art of the Electronic Age, Thames & Hudson, 1997
 Joline Blais and Jon Ippolito, At the Edge of Art, Thames & Hudson, 2006
 Oliver Grau (2003). Virtual Art: From Illusion to Immersion (Leonardo Book Series). Cambridge, Massachusetts: MIT Press/Leonardo Books. .
 Oliver Grau (Ed.): Media Art Histories, MIT Press/Leonardo Books, 2007.
 Christiane Paul, Digital Art, Thames & Hudson
 Donald Kuspit "Del Atre Analogico al Arte Digital" in Arte Digital Y Videoarte, Kuspit, D. ed., Consorcio del Circulo de Bellas Artes, Madrid, pp. 33–34 & 3 color images
 Lopes, Dominic McIver. (2009). A Philosophy of Computer Art. London: Routledge
 Robert C. Morgan Digital Hybrids, art press volume #255
 Frank Popper, From Technological to Virtual Art, MIT Press/Leonardo Books, 2007
 Alan Liu The Laws of Cool, Chicago Press, pp. 331–336 & 485-486
 Bruce Wands Art of the Digital Age, London: Thames & Hudson
 Donald Kuspit The Matrix of Sensations  VI: Digital Artists and the New Creative Renaissance
 Frank Popper, Origins and Development of Kinetic Art, Studio Vista and New York Graphic Society, 1968
 Frank Popper, Die Kinetische Kunst-Licht und Bewegung, Umweltkunst und Aktion, Dumont Schauberg, 1975
 Frank Popper, Le Déclin de l'objet, Le Chêne, 1975
 Lev Manovich (2001). [Leonardo Books, The Language of New Media] Cambridge, Massachusetts: The MIT Press/Leonardo Books. 
Dick Higgins, ‘Intermedia’ (1966), reprinted in Donna De Salvo (ed.), Open Systems Rethinking Art c. 1970, London: Tate Publishing, 2005
 Nicolas Bourriaud, (1997) Relational Aesthetics, Dijon: Les Presses du Réel, 2002, orig. 1997
 Rainer Usselmann, (2003) "The Dilemma of Media Art: Cybernetic Serendipity at the ICA London" , Cambridge, Massachusetts: The MIT Press/Leonardo Journal - Volume 36, Number 5, October 2003, pp. 389–396
 Charlie Gere, (2002) Digital Culture, Reaktion  
Lev Manovich, Ten Key Texts on Digital Art: 1970-2000 Leonardo - Volume 35, Number 5, October 2002, pp. 567–569
 Paul Brown, Charlie Gere, Nicholas Lambert, Catherine Mason (editors) (2006) White Heat Cold Logic: British Computer Art 1960–1980, Cambridge, MA: MIT Press
 Mark Hansen, (2004) New Philosophy for New Media, Cambridge, MA: MIT Press
 Frank Popper, Art—Action and Participation, New York University Press, 1975
 Frank Popper, Origins and Development of Kinetic Art, New York Graphic Society/Studio Vista, 1968
 Frank Popper, Réflexions sur l'exil, l'art et l'Europe : Entretiens avec Aline Dallier, Klincksieck, 1998
 Yucef Merhi, Artists' Fellowship - 2009 Digital/Electronic Arts, New York Foundation for the Arts, 2009
 Margot Lovejoy Digital Currents: Art in the Electronic Age, Routledge, 2004
 Frank Popper Ecrire sur l'art : De l'art optique a l'art virtuel, L'Harmattan, 2007
 Fred Forest Art et Internet, Editions Cercle D'Art / Imaginaire Mode d'Emploi
 Edward A. Shanken Selected Writings on Art and Technology http://artexetra.com
 Edward A. Shanken Art and Electronic Media. London: Phaidon, 2009. 
 Norman M. Klein, "Spaces Between: Traveling Through Bleeds, Apertures, and Wormholes Inside the Database Novel," in Third Person: Authoring and Exploring Vast Narratives, Pat Harrigan and Noah Wardip-Fruin (eds), Cambridge, A: MIT Press, 2009.

External links
 Stephen Wilson: extensive list of "information arts" links
 newArteest, list of prominent digital artists
 New Media Art book (wiki edition)

Computer art
Electronics and society
Robotic art
Visual arts genres
Contemporary art
Digital art
Postmodern art
Conceptual art